This was the first edition of the tournament.

Simone Bolelli won the title, defeating Mate Delić in the final, 6–2, 6–2.

Seeds

Draw

Finals

Top half

Bottom half

References
 Main Draw
 Qualifying Draw

2014 ATP Challenger Tour
2014 Singles